The Montagne aux Érables (in English: maple mountain) is a mountain located at Notre-Dame-du-Rosaire, in the Montmagny Regional County Municipality (MRC), in administrative region of Chaudière-Appalaches, in Quebec, Canada.

Geography
This mountain is part of Notre Dame Mountains.

Toponymy
His name was made official on December 6, 1970 at the "Banque des noms de lieux" of Commission de toponymie du Québec.

See also 
List of mountains of Quebec

References 

Appalachian summits
Summits of Chaudière-Appalaches
Notre Dame Mountains
Montmagny Regional County Municipality
Mountains of Quebec under 1000 metres